Turiúba is a municipality in the state of São Paulo in Brazil. The population is 2,020 (2020 est.) in an area of 153 km². The elevation is 439 m.

References

Municipalities in São Paulo (state)